Heinrich Arnold Theodor Spitta (19 March 1902 – 23 June 1972) was a German music educator, composer and musicologist.

Life 
Born in Strasbourg, Spitta came from a family of musicians and theologians. His father was the theologian Friedrich Spitta and his uncle the musicologist and Bach biographer Philipp Spitta.

Spitta studied with Arnold Mendelssohn and Hermann Grabner and was awarded a doctorate in 1927 at the Georg-August-Universität Göttingen with a dissertation about Heinrich Schütz.

In 1933, Spitta taught as a teacher at the Academy for Church and School Music in Berlin and was at the same time appointed to the cultural office of the Reichsjugendführer. He mainly composed choral works which were used in the celebrations of the Hitler Youth (e.g. Heilig Vaterland, 1934; Jahr überm Pflug, 1936).

From 1950 Spitta taught at the Leuphana University of Lüneburg, from 1957 as a professor. He retired in 1967. He died in Lüneburg at 70.

Publications 
 Heinrich Schuetz’ Orchester- und unveröffentlichte Werke. Göttingen 1927.

Sources 
 Fred K. Prieberg: Handbuch Deutsche Musiker 1933–1945, CD-Rom-Lexikon, Kiel 2004, p. 6720–6746.

References

External links 
 

20th-century German composers
1902 births
1972 deaths
Musicians from Strasbourg
Academic staff of the Hochschule für Musik Hanns Eisler Berlin